This is the list of episodes for the Japanese cooking television series Ryōri no Tetsujin, known among English-speaking audiences as Iron Chef, produced by Fuji Television. The series is a cooking competition in which a challenger chef "battles" one of the resident "Iron Chefs" by cooking at least one dish in a one-hour time slot based on a theme ingredient.

Not included in the lists below is a special titled " The Legend of Michiba" episode, aired on January 5, 1996. This special episode was made exclusively for the English-speaking audiences, especially "Iron Chef fans in the States."

For consistency, all Japanese names are in Western order, macroned with Hepburn romanization. All other Asian names, on the other hand, are in Eastern order. Also, for each of the non-Japanese Asian challengers, as much as possible, the name used is the romanization used by either the English-dubbed version of the show or any English language publication or website. Otherwise, the romanization used for the Chinese names is derived from the Mandarin Chinese pronunciation and Pinyin romanization of the name (the episode involving the only Korean to compete in the show has already been dubbed in English).

All Asian challengers, except those with Wikipedia articles, will have their names in kanji in parentheses upon first mention in the list. For the non-Japanese Asian challengers, the Japanese pronunciation of the name as used in the show (or at least the name used by Chairman Kaga, if subtitled without voiceovers, in the English-dubbed versions) is also included.

In the case of Asians with mixed Chinese-Japanese heritage, such as Chen Kenichi, they follow the same criteria as the Chinese names (i.e. Eastern order and Japanese pronunciation guide beside kanji).

1993

All episodes from this year are half an hour long, as opposed to at least an hour in the following years.

 This is the first battle featuring a foreign challenger.
 This is the first battle in which a challenger won against the Iron Chef.

1994

 This is the first rematch episode.
 Sakai's first battle as Iron Chef.
 This is the first episode to feature a female challenger.
 This is the first tag team match wherein both teams have no assistants.
 There were two different Keiji Nakazawas with two different specialties who battled two different Iron Chefs Japanese almost five years apart. The first one, a French cuisine chef, battled against Michiba, while the other one, a sushi chef, battled against Morimoto.

The last episode of 1994 covers the first half of the 1994 Mr. Iron Chef competition featuring winning challengers from previous episodes. The winner faced off against an Iron Chef.

1995

 This episode covers the second half of the 1994 Mr. Iron Chef competition.
 As the winner of the preliminary finals, Kandagawa challenged Michiba in the final round of 1994 Mr. Iron Chef.
 This the Valentine's Day battle. Also the first battle to feature two theme ingredients.
 This is the Hong Kong Special, wherein both battles were held there. It is actually a two-hour special, although it has been erroneously labelled as a two-episode special.
 This is Ishinabe's final ever battle as an Iron Chef.
 Second ever tag-team battle.
 This is Bruant's second appearance in Kitchen Stadium, challenging the Iron Chef he did not choose in the tag-team battle the year before.
 The 1995 Iron Chef World Cup at Ariake Coliseum, which pitted the masters of French, Japanese, Italian, and Chinese cuisines against each other in a single-elimination tournament to determine the best in the world. The winners of the first two battles squared off against each other in the final match. Michiba represented Japanese cuisine, hence the retention of his Iron Chef color in this chart. The final is also covered in the English-only exclusive "Legend of Michiba" episode.
 &   Lin and Michiba's battle ended in a draw, hence the overtime match the next week with a new theme ingredient.
 Kandagawa was the 100th even challenger, when separate appearances by a challenger count as two challengers.
 The first episode where they started displaying the judging panel's scores.

The last episode of 1995 covered the first half of 1995 Mr. Iron Chef competition. The winner would battle Michiba, who was about to retire as a regular Iron Chef.

1996
The first episode of 1996 covered the second half of 1995 Mr. Iron Chef competition. This would be Michiba's last battle as a regular Iron Chef.

 This episode debuts Nakamura as Michiba's hand picked successor.
 This episode, known as the France Special, took place in Château de Brissac in Anjou, France. It also took place to promote Gagnaire's restaurant, which was on the verge of closing. This episode was aired as two separate episodes in the dubbed version (although these two merged as a single two-hour episode in the Food Network).
 The three-hour Beijing Special taking place in the Forbidden City and pitting the best of four styles of Chinese cooking (Canton, Beijing, Shanghai, and Sichuan) against each other. The first battle was a semifinal round with all four chefs, with the chefs with the two highest scores advancing to the final.
 This episode served as a rematch to their battle back in France.

The last episode of 1996 is the New Year's Eve episode wherein 100 judges were said to have sampled the osechi New Year food prepared by Michiba and Nakamura, which took 100 minutes and 10 assistants each to make, with the battle concluding at midnight on New Year's.

1997

 Wild animals hunted for game.
 This is the second overtime episode.
 There was no theme ingredient, just a theme that the chefs' dishes must focus on.
 This is Kobe's debut battle as an Iron Chef, and he loses.
 For the summer battle, Chairman Kaga grouped the four Iron Chefs by the continental birthplace of their cuisines. Kobe and Sakai composed "Team Europe" while Chen and Nakamura were "Team Asia."
 This episode covers the 1997 Iron Chef World Cup. Much like the 1995 Iron Chef World Cup, it pitted the masters of French, Japanese, Chinese, and New American (instead of Italian) cuisines against each other in elimination matches. The winners of the first two battles squared off against each other in the final match. Nakamura represented Japanese cuisine, hence the retention of his Iron Chef color in this chart.

 This is the first drawn battle that did not immediately result in an overtime match. In fact, a rematch between Passard and Nakamura never took place.

1998

 This episode featuring Nakamura's retirement battle, counted as one, was aired in two parts. This was also Yukio Hattori's second time taking the role of challenger; former Iron Chef Japanese Rokusaburo Michiba took his place as commentator.
 This is Masaharu Morimoto's debut as Iron Chef.
 This episode is the second without a theme ingredient but rather a theme on which the dishes should be based.
 The 2,000th Dish Special, wherein two teams composed of Iron Chefs and past challengers, was aired in two parts. Chairman Kaga also used this special as an opportunity to list his five best and three worst dishes tasted in the show. The score was tied at 77 points for each team, but Kaga decided that the All-French team won.

1999

 This episode, aired in two parts, celebrated Morimoto's first anniversary as an Iron Chef. The two elder Iron Chefs Japanese were present to help Morimoto put his focus back.
 This is the first episode in which all four Iron Chefs appear at the same time, rather than have Kobe making a separate entrance. This was also the first episode wherein Chairman Kaga boycotted the battle due to the Iron Chefs' recent losses. Yukio Hattori did double-duty as emcee and usual color commentator for this episode.
 There were two different Keiji Nakazawas with two different specialties who battled two different Iron Chefs Japanese almost five years apart. The first one, a French cuisine chef, battled against Michiba, while the other one, a sushi chef, battled against Morimoto.
 Theme ingredients included tuna, kohada (Japanese gizzard shad), anago, eggs, and kanpyō. Also, the one-hour time limit for the battle did not include the preparation of the rice to be used for the sushi.
 Both Chen and Corby were declared joint winners in the overtime battle.
 The final three episodes cover the King of Iron Chefs tournament which saw the Iron Chefs battle against each other. The last Iron Chef standing would then battle the last ever challenger in the show's regular run, Alain Passard.

Specials (2000–2002)

Specials notes

The Millennium Cup, occurring three months after the last regular battle, introduced two "new" Iron Chefs in the persons of Yūji Wakiya and Seigo Mitani as successors to Iron Chefs Sakai and Chen. Both actually never battled since their introduction. And while there were two battles, all four chefs involved were competing to have one of their dishes be declared as the "Millennium Dish." Although Bouchet lost his battle with Michiba, his beef main course was declared the "Millennium Dish."

The first part of the New York Special saw Iron Chefs Morimoto, Sakai, Kobe and Honorary Iron Chef Michiba visit the city. During the Iron Chefs' visit to the Zagat weekend home, Tim and Nina Zagat had arranged a battle between Morimoto and Flay. Also included in the first part were Kobe and Sakai's visit to an Asian cooking class in the Culinary Institute of America and Morimoto and Michiba's guesting in an episode of Doorknock Dinners. Gordon Elliott, the host of that show, would also serve as the English-speaking host for Flay and Morimoto's battle in the second half of the special alongside Kaga.

The 21st Century Battles were held especially to usher in the beginning of the 21st century, and brought back two previous challengers. The first was prolific guest Toshirō Kandagawa, who shaved himself bald to atone for his antagonistic role in the past. The second, Bobby Flay, was brought back to fulfill a clamor for a rematch against Morimoto as according to several reports, Flay did not take his loss very well, even complaining about the treatment against him in that battle (the show even cited a Time magazine article to bring home the point).

In the events that led to the Japan Cup, Chairman Kaga (the character) had died due to puffer fish liver poisoning. A memorial service was held before the new chairman, Kaga's equally flamboyant nephew, played by actor Masahiro Motoki, was introduced. The Japan Cup, launched to keep the tradition of Kitchen Stadium alive, was held at the Tokyo Dome. Chen was chosen to represent Chinese cuisine while the selection of representatives for French, Italian, and Japanese cuisines was opened to "unknown nameless chefs." There were only two battles that were covered in full: Chen's semifinal battle and finals between Chen and Nonaga; only highlights of Nonaga's semifinal battle were shown due to time constraints. Takeshi Kaga, the actor portraying the character Chairman Kaga, was still alive at the time of the Japan Cup (and still is as of 2023, according to IMDb); his character was killed off due to commitments he had at the time that prevented him from reprising his role. The story element of the "death" of Kaga's character was ignored in Iron Chef America: Battle of the Masters, as according to that show's storyline, it was Chairman Kaga himself who sent Sakai and Morimoto to America to grace the opening a new Gourmet Academy there.

Revival series (2012–2013)
On October 26, 2012, Fuji TV revived the original Iron Chef franchise, this time simply using the English name Iron Chef (アイアンシェフ). Actor Hiroshi Tamaki assumed the role as the new Chairman in this revival. For the line-up of Iron Chefs, Yuji Wakiya became the official Iron Chef Chinese, while Yōsuke Suga was selected as the new Iron Chef French instead of Seigo Mitani; Jun Kurogi was chosen as the new Iron Chef Japanese. Yukio Hattori would reprise his role as commentor, guided by a set of culinary experts.

Unlike the previous series, the 2012 revival has challengers nominated by prominent personalities, such as past Iron Chefs. Through public vote, challengers who won battles would have a chance to officially become future Iron Chefs.

For consistency, all Japanese names are in Western order, macroned with Hepburn romanization. All other Asian names, on the other hand, are in Eastern order. Also, for each of the non-Japanese Asian challengers, as much as possible, the romanization used for the Chinese names are derived from the Mandarin Chinese pronunciation and Pinyin romanization of the name.

All Asian challengers, except those with Wikipedia articles, will have their names in kanji in parentheses upon first mention in the list. For the non-Japanese Asian challengers, the Japanese pronunciation of the name as used in the show is also included.

In the case of Asians with mixed Chinese-Japanese heritage, such as Chen Kenichi, they follow the same criteria as the Chinese names (i.e. Eastern order and Japanese pronunciation guide beside kanji).

2012

The last episode of 2012 is the New Year's Eve episode as the Mr. Iron Chef competition. It was broadcast live for six hours and there were seven judges for each battle. It was broadcast as alternative programming to NHK's hugely popular Kōhaku Uta Gassen.

2013

References

External links
 List of episodes held at The Iron Chef Exchange
 Japanese Iron Chef fan site
 Transcription/Translation of the Iron Chef Japan Cup 2002
 WWWJDIC (Monash University server)

Lists of food television series episodes
Lists of Japanese television series episodes
Episodes